"Vagabund der Liebe" is a song by Greek singer Demis Roussos. It was first released as a single in 1975 on Philips Records.

Later it was included on Roussos' 1976 German-language album Die Nacht und der Wein.

Background and writing 
The song was written by Klaus Munro, Ralf Arnie, and Leo Leandros. The recording was produced by Leo Leandros.

Commercial performance 
The song spent 10 weeks in the German chart, peaking at no. 22.

Track listing 
7" single Philips 6009 691 (August 1975, Germany, Austria)
 A. "Vagabund der Liebe" (4:05)
 B. "Ich bin frei" (3:02)

Charts

References

External links 
 Demis Roussos — "Vagabund der Liebe" at Discogs

1975 songs
1975 singles
Demis Roussos songs
Philips Records singles
Songs written by Leo Leandros

Song recordings produced by Leo Leandros